The Seventeenth Federal Electoral District of the Federal District (XVII Distrito Electoral Federal del Distrito Federal) is one of the 300 Electoral Districts into which Mexico is divided for the purpose of elections to the federal Chamber of Deputies and one of 27 such districts in the Federal District ("DF" or Mexico City).

It elects one deputy to the lower house of Congress for each three-year legislative period, by means of the first past the post system.

District territory
Under the 2005 districting scheme, the DF's Seventeenth District covers the whole of
the borough (delegación) of Cuajimalpa,
plus that portion of the borough of Álvaro Obregón not covered by either the 16th or 26th Districts.

Previous districting schemes

1996–2005 district
Between 1996 and 2005, the 17th District covered the whole of Cuajimalpa, plus a portion of Álvaro Obregón located in the north of the borough.

Deputies returned to Congress from this district

XLII Legislature
 1952–1955: Alfonso Martínez Domínguez (PRI)
XLIII Legislature
 1955–1958: Alfonso Ituarte Servín (PAN)
L Legislature
 1976–1979: Héctor Hernández Casanova (PRI)
LI Legislature
 1979–1982: Rubén Figueroa Alcocer (PRI)
LII Legislature
 1982–1985: Guillermo Dávila Martínez (PRI)
LIII Legislature
 1985–1988:
LIV Legislature
 1988–1991: José Luis Luege Tamargo (PAN)
LV Legislature
 1991–1994:
LVI Legislature
 1994–1997: Sebastián Lerdo de Tejada Covarrubias (PRI)
LVII Legislature
 1997–2000:
LVIII Legislature
 2000–2003: Sara Guadalupe Figueroa Canedo (PVEM)
LIX Legislature
 2003–2006: María Angélica Díaz (PRD)
LX Legislature
 2006–2009: Aleida Alavez Ruiz (PRD)

References and notes

Federal electoral districts of Mexico
Mexico City
Federal Electoral District 17
Federal Electoral District 17